WEVL (89.9 FM) is a Memphis, Tennessee, radio station with a freeform format.  It airs live in Memphis and online.

Awards
 WEVL voted "Best FM Station" in Memphis Flyer's "Best of Memphis" 2007 poll.
 WEVL takes second place for Best FM Station in the Memphis Flyer's 2006 Best of Memphis Poll

Notable personalities
 Joyce Cobb 
 Dee "Cap'n Pete" Henderson
 "Bashful Bob"
 Jim "The Ol' Ridge Runner" Lillard

See also
List of community radio stations in the United States

References

External links
WEVL Radio official website
Listen Live

EVL
Freeform radio stations
Radio stations established in 1976
1976 establishments in Tennessee
Community radio stations in the United States